The Democratic Arab Socialist Union (Al-ittiḥād al-ishtirākī al-'arabī al-dīmūqrāṭī; French: Union arabe socialiste démocratique) is a Nasserist democratic socialist Syrian political party based in Paris, France. It was founded in a split of the Arab Socialist Union Party of Syria, with Hassan 'Abd al-Azim as its general secretary.

Is part of the National Democratic Rally coalition (Al-tajammuʻ al-waṭanī al-dīmūqrāṭī).

After Hafez al-Assad took power in 1970, the ASU entered into negotiations about a coalition government, and agreed to join the National Progressive Front (NPF) in 1972. The year after, however, the party split over the adoption of a Syrian constitution in which the Ba'ath was proclaimed the "leading party" of the country. One minor faction under Fawzi Kiyali accepted the constitution, and retained both the ASU name and the NPF membership, while most members followed party leader Jamal al-Atassi into opposition, by renaming themselves the Democratic Arab Socialist Union.

Hassan Ismail Abdelazim was arrested by the Syrian authorities in May 2011 as a crackdown on opposition forces in Syria.

References

1980 establishments in Syria
Arab nationalism in Syria
Arab Socialist Union
Democratic socialist parties in Asia
Nasserist political parties
Political parties established in 1980
Political parties in Syria
Socialist parties in Syria
Syrian opposition